Gu Shanqing (born November 1931) is a general in the People's Liberation Army of China who served as political commissar of the Chengdu Military Region from April 1990 to November 1992 and political commissar of the Beijing Military Region from November 1992 to November 1996.

He was a member of the 14th Central Committee of the Chinese Communist Party and a member of the Standing Committee of the 9th National People's Congress.

Biography
Gu was born in Fu County (now Wafangdian), Liaoning, in November 1931. 

He enlisted in the People's Liberation Army (PLA) in December 1947, and joined the Chinese Communist Party (CCP) in November 1949. He served in the  before being assigned to the 41th Group Army in 1951. In 1959, he enrolled at the PLA Changsha No. 1 Political School and worked there after graduation. In 1969, he was despatched to the Guangzhou Military Region, one of the People's Liberation Army PLA Military Regions. He was made deputy political commissar of Shaoyang Military Area in 1982 and one year later was promoted to become political commissar of the Hunan Military District. He was transferred back to the Guangzhou Military Region in February 1988 and appointed deputy political commissar. In April 1990, he was commissioned as political commissar of the Chengdu Military Region, he remained in that position until April 1990, when he was transferred to the Beijing Military Region and given the position of political commissar. He retired in November 1996.

He was promoted to the rank of major general (shaojiang) in 1988, lieutenant general (zhongjiang) in 1990, and general (shangjiang) in 1994.

References

1931 births
Living people
People from Wafangdian
People's Liberation Army generals from Liaoning
People's Republic of China politicians from Liaoning
Chinese Communist Party politicians from Liaoning
Political commissars of the Chengdu Military Region
Political commissars of the Beijing Military Region
Members of the Standing Committee of the 9th National People's Congress
Members of the 14th Central Committee of the Chinese Communist Party